Allaire may refer to:

Organizations
Allaire Corporation, a web development company acquired by Macromedia in 2001
Allaire Iron Works, a 19th-century marine engineering company in New York City
Allaire Studios, a former recording studio in Glen Tonche, New York

Places
Allaire, Morbihan, a commune of the Morbihan département, in France
Allaire, New Jersey, an unincorporated community 
Allaire State Park, a state park in the above community
Allaire Village, a living history museum in Allaire State Park
Allaire Airport or Monmouth Jet Center, New Jersey
Allaire Peak, in the Prince Olav Mountains, Antarctica

Other uses
Allaire (surname), a French surname
Allaire du Pont (1913–2006), an American sportswoman and racehorse owner
Allaire Report, 1991, recommending a transfer of powers to Quebec